Muratlı is a town and a district of Tekirdağ Province in the Marmara Region of Turkey. It is located at 24 km north of the town of Tekirdağ and on the railway line from Istanbul to the Bulgarian border. It covers an area of 427 km², and the population is about 20,000. The district has hot summers and cold winters. The mayor is Nebi Tepe (CHP).

Places of interest
The railway station - built in 1870; the Orient Express passed through here between Istanbul and Europe. 
İnanlı Çeşmesi - a fountain built in 1914
The house that Atatürk visited - in 1935 Atatürk ordered the construction of a settlement for Turkish refugees from Bulgaria and Romania. On 3 June 1936 he made a visit of inspection to one of the houses, commemorated by a plaque in the garden, which has "You lucky refugee don't forget 3rd of June, he became visitor to your house, he presented love to your all " written on it.

References

External links
 Murateli.Net
 Muratlı Photo Gallery

Towns in Turkey
Districts of Tekirdağ Province
Populated places in Tekirdağ Province